The 1934 Currie Cup was the 18th edition of the Currie Cup, the premier domestic rugby union competition in South Africa.

See also

 Currie Cup

References

1934
1934 in South African rugby union
Currie